Emmis Communications is an American media conglomerate based in Indianapolis, Indiana. Emmis, based on the Hebrew word for Truth (Emet) was founded by Jeff Smulyan in 1980. Emmis has owned many radio stations, including KPWR and WQHT, which have notoriety for their Hip Hop Rhythmic format as well as WFAN, which was the world's first 24-hour sports talk radio station. In addition to radio, Emmis has invested in TV, publishing, and mobile operations around the United States.

History

1980s 
In 1980, Emmis Broadcasting founder Jeffrey Smulyan purchased his first radio station, WSVL-FM Shelbyville, Indiana. In July 1981, Smulyan changed the format from country music to adult contemporary and renamed the station WENS and later to WLHK.

In 1982, Emmis acquired WLOL in Minneapolis, MN and quickly became a top contender for ratings.

Around 1984, the company bought Magic 106 in Los Angeles, California; at the time, L.A. Lakers player "Magic" Johnson was an early spokesperson for the station. Emmis also bought KSHE in St. Louis in the same year.

In early 1986, Emmis changed Magic 106, which focused on traditional top 40 rock, to Power 106 KPWR, which would focus on dance, top40, and shock-jock talk.

In 1987, Emmis made a series of purchases including WQHT, WYNY, and WNBC in New York, WKQX in Chicago, WJIB in Boston, WKUU and KXXX in San Francisco, and KKHT in Houston. They also acquired WAVA-FM in Washington, D.C. from the Doubleday Broadcasting Company. Both KPWR and WQHT would pioneer the urban contemporary rhythmic format. Emmis transformed WHN into the world's first all-sports radio station, WFAN.

In 1988, Emmis entered the world of publishing. Emmis purchased Indianapolis Monthly and added WKQX in Chicago to its radio portfolio. Also, Emmis acquired five NBC radio stations in 1988.

Chairman and CEO Jeff Smulyan purchased the Seattle Mariners Major League Baseball team in 1989.

1990s 
Emmis kicked off the 1990s by selling KKHT-FM in Houston to Nationwide Communications in May 1990.

In 1991, Emmis sold two more stations: WLOL to Minnesota Public Radio and KXXX, San Francisco, to Alliance Broadcasting. Also in 1991, KMGG became KPWR, "Power 106" and became the first rhythmic contemporary-focused top 40 formatted outlet.

In 1992, Emmis sold WFAN, New York, to Infinity for US$70M, which was one of the highest prices ever paid for an AM radio station. Emmis also sold WAVA-FM, Washington D.C., to Salem Broadcasting and WJIB, Boston, to Greater Media. In the same year, Jeff Smulyan sold the Seattle Mariners to Nintendo.

Emmis grew its publishing portfolio by adding Atlanta Magazine in 1993. In the same year, Emmis launched its second hip hop station in America, Hot 97. Emmis' Q101 in Chicago moved into an Alternative Rock Format.

In 1994, the company purchased WIBC (now WFNI) and WKLR (now WIBC (FM)) in Indianapolis from the Horizon Broadcast Corporation and WRKS in New York City from the Summit Communications Group. WKLR was changed from an oldies format to a classic hits format with the call letters of WNAP-FM in September 1994. Emmis became a public company, EMMS on NASDAQ, with an IPO on March 4, 1994.

The following year, 1995, WQHT and KPWR were among the top rated radio station in each of their markets. This resulted in a record-breaking accomplishment where Emmis was the first company to own top rated radio stations in the top 2 markets. Later in 1996, WHHH (formerly WTLC-AM/FM) became top rated for Urban Adult Contemporary.

Emmis entered the world of international radio in 1997 when the company was awarded a license to operate in Hungary, Sláger Radio, which debuted #1 nationwide and remained the country's most popular national radio station until the Hungarian government revoked the license in 2009. Emmis added Cincinnati Magazine to its publishing group, as well as KIHT-FM and KPNT-FM in St. Louis to its rock collection.

In 1998, Emmis Broadcasting changed its name to Emmis Communications and moved into its current headquarters on Monument Circle in Indianapolis. Emmis acquired a lot of media in the same year including Texas Monthly, WRXP in New York, WTHI and WWVR in Terre Haute, and six television stations in Honolulu, New Orleans, Green Bay, and Mobile, Alabama, from SF Broadcasting and in Terre Haute, Indiana, and Ft. Myers, Florida, from Wabash Valley Broadcasting RadioNow was launched in Indianapolis as a Top 40 format.

Emmis purchased Country Sampler Magazine in 1999 and Liberty Media purchased 2.7 million shares of Emmis for approximately $150M.

2000s 
In 2005, Emmis changed the format of its first radio station from its long-term adult contemporary format to country, and the call letters were changed from WENS to WLHK. Emmis was also named one of Fortunes 100 Best Companies to Work For. In March of that year, Emmis Communications and 98.7 KISS-FM, New York, celebrated Women's History Month by introducing their first annual salute to Phenomenal Women (also referred to as the Phenomenal Woman Awards).

In 2006, Emmis flipped KZLA Los Angeles to Adult Rhythmic Contemporary as "KMVN, Movin' 93.9". The move gave Emmis a companion station to complement KPWR. However, on April 15, 2009, KMVN switched to Spanish-language programming, KXOS, under a seven-year Local Marketing Agreement with Grupo Radio Centro of Mexico City.

On June 9, 2009, Emmis announced it had formed a strategic alliance with StreamTheWorld, the radio industry's streaming technology and services company, to put all Emmis radio stations on a new streaming platform.

2010s 
On January 12, 2011, the share price of Emmis stock surged 42% as insiders speculated that the company could be close to selling off several of its radio stations. In its January 2011 filing with the Securities and Exchange Commission, the company reported that it had the necessary cash to survive through February 2011. "Absent asset sales, which the company is actively pursuing," Emmis attorneys stated in the regulatory filing, "the company believes it is unlikely it will be able to maintain compliance with the financial covenants after Sept. 1, 2011".

On August 16, 2013, Emmis launched the NextRadio smartphone app on HTC One Android phones from Sprint. A deal struck between the radio industry and Sprint facilitated the launch which subsequently enabled FM radio support for the app on additional Android devices available on the Sprint wireless network.

On October 12, 2016, Emmis announced that it would sell its radio stations in the Terre Haute cluster to Midwest Communications and DLC Media. Midwest Communications would acquire WTHI-FM and the intellectual property of WWVR while DLC Media would acquire WFNF, WFNB and the broadcast license for WWVR. Midwest Communications would also sell WDKE to DLC Media to stay under FCC ownership limits. The sale was consummated on January 27, 2017.

On March 1, 2017, Emmis announced it had sold four of its magazines (Atlanta, Cincinnati, Los Angeles, and Orange Coast) to Hour Media Group, LLC for $6.5 million. It also sold Texas Monthly to Genesis Park, LP for $25 million.

On May 9, 2017, Emmis announced that it would sell KPWR to The Meruelo Group for $82.75 million. The announcement came after Emmis made a deal in April with its lenders to seek $80 million worth of divestments by January 2018 to amend its credit agreement. The Meruelo Group began operating the station under an LMA on July 1, 2017, until the sale was consummated on August 1, 2017.

On January 30, 2018, Emmis announced it would leave the St. Louis market, selling KSHE and KPNT to Hubbard Broadcasting, and KFTK and KNOU to Entercom.

In June 2019, Emmis announced that it would sell its controlling stake in its Austin stations to its minority partner Sinclair Telecable Inc. (d/b/a Sinclair Communications, unrelated to Sinclair Broadcast Group).

On July 1, 2019, Emmis announced that it would sell its New York City stations WQHT and WBLS to Mediaco Holding—an affiliate of Standard General—for $91.5 million, a $5 million promissory note, and a 23.72% stake in the new company. Mediaco Holding will be a public company, and Emmis will continue to manage the stations. The sale was completed November 25, 2019.

2020s 
On March 11, 2020, Emmis announced that it had purchased sound masking technology company Lencore Acoustics.

On April 24, 2020, Emmis announced that it would voluntarily delist from the Nasdaq, citing cost-saving concerns.

On June 13, 2022, Emmis announced it will sell their Indianapolis radio properties to Urban One for an undisclosed amount.

Company portfolio

Lencore Acoustics 
Emmis acquired Lencore in 2020. They build systems for Sound Masking, Paging and Audio with applications in a variety of industries. Major clients include: Amazon, AT&T, CVS Health, Coca-Cola, Ford, Ernst & Young, Michelin among many others.

Digonex 
Emmis acquired Digonex in 2014. Digonex is a technology company.

Former magazines 
 Atlanta
 Cincinnati
 Indianapolis Monthly
 Los Angeles
 Orange Coast
 Texas Monthly

NextRadio app 
The NextRadio smartphone app was developed by Emmis, with support from the National Association of Broadcasters, to enable FM radio reception on mobile devices with activated internal FM receivers. NextRadio allows users of many FM-enabled smartphones to listen to broadcast FM radio—with no need for Internet connection or use of phone data—and receive supplemental data such as album art, program information, and metadata over the Internet if connected. Launched in August 2013 through a radio industry agreement with Sprint Corporation, the app was preloaded on some devices, and  available for download in the Google Play Store of Android applications.

The NextRadio app is powered by TagStation, an Emmis-developed cloud data service for enhanced radio broadcasting. TagStation allows broadcasters a web-based platform for managing supplemental content for delivery to the NextRadio app, HD Radio receivers, and connected car dashboards.

During the quarter ended November 30, 2018, Emmis decided to dramatically reduce the scale of operations in TagStation, LLC and NextRadio, LLC. In connection with this decision, the company recognized $1.2 million of severance related to the termination of 35 employees. Emmis Chairman and CEO Jeff Smulyan said on the company's second quarter earnings call that Emmis was "unwilling and unable" to continue funding the NextRadio and TagStation businesses.

In January 2019, Radio World published a long article analyzing NextRadio's operation and failure, suggesting that the long-term, unfulfilled, hope was that the radio industry could eventually monetize the NextRadio app, in part by providing advertisers with good analytical information and insights into radio's return on investment.

As of the end of 2021 version  6.0.2492 (January 2, 2019) of the NextRadio app remained available on the Google Play Store.

WorldBand Media HD Radio deal 
Emmis announced on September 9, 2008, that it had teamed up with digital radio network WorldBand Media and would be using the "HD-3" subchannels to produce programming for the South Asian communities in Chicago (on WLUP), Los Angeles (on KPWR), and New York (on WQHT), and would include a combination of local and international content that should be available by mid-October 2008.

Current radio stations

Former television stations 
In May 2005, Emmis announced its intent to sell some or all of the 16 television stations they owned at the time. In August 2005, the company announced the sale of nine television stations, as well as four more in October, an additional station in May 2006, another station in February 2007, and its final station in May 2008. Emmis no longer owns any television stations.

Stations are arranged alphabetically by state and by city of license.

Former radio stations

Board of directors 
 Jeff Smulyan – Chairman of the Board, President and CEO; former owner of Major League Baseball's Seattle Mariners
 Susan Bayh – Visiting Professor, Butler University
 Gary Kaseff – Executive Vice President and General Counsel
 Richard Leventhal – President & Majority Owner of LMCS, LLC.
 Peter Lund – Media Consultant and former President & CEO of CBS Television.
 Greg Nathanson – former Television Division President
 Lawrence Sorrel – Tailwind Capital Partners
 Patrick Walsh – Chief Operating Officer and Chief Financial Officer

See also

Notes

References

External links 

 
 Emmis Interactive Official website
 2004 consent decree with FCC

 
1980 establishments in Indiana
American companies established in 1980
Companies based in Indianapolis
Companies listed on the Nasdaq
Magazine publishing companies of the United States
Mass media companies established in 1980
Mass media companies of the United States
Radio broadcasting companies of the United States